Kofi Genfi  (born ) is a Ghanaian entrepreneur and business executive. He is the co-founder of both Mazzuma and Utopia Technologies: two companies in the digital commerce space for emerging markets. He is the Director of Business Strategy for Mazzuma.

Early life and education 
Genfi was born in Ghana and had his secondary education at the Presbyterian Boys Senior High School, Legon. He further studied Business Administration at the Ashesi University.

Career 
In 2013, Kofi Genfi co-founded CYST, a software innovation company specializing in Artificial Intelligence, Blockchain, and mobile payment systems to improve financial inclusion in emerging markets through its flagship product called Mazzuma and processes transactional volumes.

He also provided consulting, engineering services, project management, and technical support for the United Nations Development Program (UNDP)  in the field of Effective Plastic Waste Management and is a stakeholder of the Global Plastic Action Partnership.

Recognition 
Genfi was recognised in the Forbes 30 Under 30 Technology category. He was the winner for the 2019 Discovery of the Year category of the Exclusive Men of the Year Africa Awards (EMY Awards) in 2019

References 

Living people
1993 births
Ghanaian businesspeople
People from Accra
Business executives by nationality
business executives
Ashesi University alumni